Aquimarina pacifica  is a Gram-negative, strictly aerobic, rod-shaped bacterium from the genus of Aquimarina which has been isolated from seawater from the South Pacific Gyre from the Pacific Ocean.

References

External links
Type strain of Aquimarina pacifica at BacDive -  the Bacterial Diversity Metadatabase	

Flavobacteria
Bacteria described in 2014